Richard Jones is an American poet. He was born in London, England, received his B.A. and M.A. from the University of Virginia and an M.F.A. from Vermont College of Fine Arts. He is the author of eleven books of poetry, most recently The Minor Key (Green Linden Press, 2021), as well as a number of limited edition volumes. His first book, Country of Air, won the Posner Award in 1986. The Blessing: New and Selected Poems, a selection of poems from six of his books, received the Midland Authors Award for Poetry for 2000. He is also the editor of the critical anthology Poetry and Politics (William Morrow and Company, 1985). In 2000, he published a compact disc, Body and Soul, in which he discusses the art of poetry. In 2011, he published Thunder on the Mountain (East of Eden Press), a nonfiction book that explores the relationship between poetry and painting. He is editor of the literary journal Poetry East and its many anthologies, including The Last Believer in Words and Bliss. He is currently professor of English at DePaul University in Chicago, where he has taught since 1987. He lives north of Chicago with his wife and three children.

Selected works

Poetry
’’Country of Air’’ (Copper Canyon Press, 1986)
’’At Last We Enter Paradise’’ (Copper Canyon Press, 1991)
’’A Perfect Time’’ (Copper Canyon Press, 1994)
’’48 Questions’’ (Tebot Bach Books, 1998)
’’The Blessing: New and Selected Poems’’ (Copper Canyon Press, 2000)
’’Apropos of Nothing’’ (Copper Canyon Press, 2006)
’’The Correct Spelling & Exact Meaning’’ (Copper Canyon Press, 2010)
’’Stranger on Earth’’ (Copper Canyon Press, 2018)
’’Avalon’’ (Green Linden Press, 2020)
’’Paris’’ (Tebot Bach Books, 2021)
’’The Minor Key’’ (Green Linden Press, 2021)

Poetry limited editions
’’Windows and Walls’’ (Adastra Press, 1982)
’’Innocent Things’’ (Adastra Press, 1985)
’’Walk On’’ (Alderman Press, 1986)
’’Sonnets’’ (Adastra Press, 1990)
’’The Abandoned Garden’’ (Tunheim Santrizos, 1997)
’’The Stone It Lives On’’ (Adastra Press, 2000)
’’King of Hearts’’ (Adastra Press, 2015)

Nonfiction
’’Thunder on the Mountain’’ (East of Eden Press, 2011)

Anthologies edited (selected volumes)
’’The Last Believer in Words’’ (Poetry East, #45 & 46, 1998)
’’Bliss’’ (Poetry East, #60, Autumn 2007)
’’Wider Than the Sky’’ (Poetry East, #70, Spring 2011)
’’Origins’’ (Poetry East, #79, Spring 2013)
’’Abandoned Houses’’ (Poetry East, #82, Spring 2014)
’’Paris’’ (Poetry East, #83, Autumn 2014)
’’London’’ (Poetry East, #87, Spring 2016)
’’Kyoto’’ (Poetry East, #88 & 89, Autumn 2016)

References

2. Richard Jones, "The Answer," (poem) http://artsbeat.blogs.nytimes.com/2013/10/24/poetry-profiles-copper-canyon-press/

Year of birth missing (living people)
Living people
Writers from London
University of Virginia alumni
Vermont College of Fine Arts alumni
American male poets
DePaul University faculty
English emigrants to the United States